Destroyer Squadron 14, now Naval Surface Squadron Fourteen (CNSS 14, or SURFRON 14), is the administrative Immediate Superior in Command (ISIC) for ships that are homeported at Naval Station Mayport in Jacksonville, Florida.

CNSS 14 was established on 31 July 2015 by the merging of Destroyer Squadron Fourteen and Cruiser Destroyer Readiness Support Detachment Mayport. SURFRON 14's roots thus go back to the establishment of the original DESRON Fourteen in 1920.

References 

Destroyer squadrons of the United States Navy
Military units and formations established in 1920
Military units and formations established in 2015
2015 establishments in Florida